Lake Independence may refer to:

Lake Independence (Michigan), a lake
Lake Independence (Jackson County, Minnesota), a lake
Lake Independence (Belize House constituency), Belize

See also
Independence Lake (disambiguation)
Independence Lakes, a number of lakes in Idaho